Othello is Liz White's 1980 dramatic adaptation of William Shakespeare's Othello. An all black cast and crew, including actor Yaphet Kotto, created the film.

Cast
Yaphet Kotto as Othello
Benjamin Ashburn as Montano
Olive Bowles as Emilia
Louis Chisholm, Jr. as Cassio
Audrey Dixon as Desdemona
Richard Dixon as Iago
Douglas Gray as Roderigo
Lincoln Pope as Duke of Venice
Liz White as Bianca
Jim Williams as Brabantio

Production
White's Othello began as an acclaimed performance in 1960-1961 at Shearer Summer Theater, White's own repository company on Martha's Vineyeard, and in 1960 in Harlem. Shearer began the repository with a mission to create more roles for the black actors and more jobs for black theater technicians. The entire cast and crew of the film are black.

Filming
With help from Charles Dorkins, White directed the film over the summers from 1962-1966. Most involved with the project were students or maintained part- or full-time jobs during filming—even White worked as a stage dresser during production. The film was further delayed when Yaphet Kotto began his Hollywood movie career.

Casting
White herself played Bianca and she enlisted her son and daughter-in-law, Richard and Audrey Dixon, as Iago and Desdemona.

Release
The film did not screen until 1980, when it had its official debut at Howard University. In White's biography in the promotion materials for the debut, it reads: "[Liz] works out of her apartment in the Dunbar complex in Harlem and at the editing space she rents in the Screen Building on Broadway. She is cutting and editing a print of her feature length film, "Othello", sleeping on the studio floor some nights." The film's release was in part due to White's reluctance to label the film an "art" film. She attempted to market the film to various studios, including Warner Brothers. It has never been released commercially.

References

External links

 1980 Program for Othello
 Promotional material for Othello
 Liz White's "Othello" by Peter Donaldson

1980 films
1980s English-language films
African-American drama films
American films based on plays
Films based on Othello
Unreleased American films